Pearman is a surname. Notable people with the surname include:

Alvin Pearman (born 1982), American football running back
George Pearman, MP
Graeme Pearman (born 1941), Chief of CSIRO Atmospheric Research in Australia from 1992 to 2002
Hugh Pearman (architecture critic), the architecture critic of The Sunday Times and editor of The RIBA Journal
Hugh Pearman (cricketer) (born 1945), English cricketer
Joseph Pearman (1892–1961), American athlete who competed mainly in the 10 kilometre walk
Roger Pearman (born 1939), English rugby union and rugby league footballer who played in the 1960s, and coached rugby league in the 1960s
Roger Pearman (cricketer) (1943–2009), English cricketer and cricket administrator
Tom Pearman (born 1979), English cricketer
Raven-Symoné Christina Pearman (born 1985), American actress and singer

See also
Conyers Dill & Pearman, offshore law firm
Silas N. Pearman Bridge, cantilever bridge that crossed the Cooper River in Charleston, South Carolina, USA